Heartland is a  25-novel series created by Lauren Brooke, and begun in 2000 with the novel Coming Home. The series is about a girl named Amy Fleming, who lives on a horse ranch called Heartland in Virginia, where she, family, and friends heal and help abused or mistreated horses. They attempt to help the abused horses by using psychologically based therapies instead of more traditional training methods. Throughout the series, the main character, Amy, finds healing along with the horses that she treats. Eventually, Amy is faced with tough decisions that put Heartland's future and fate in her hands. The target readership is ages 8 to 14. In 2007, a TV series based on the novels, but set in the Canadian province of Alberta, debuted in Canada on the CBC network.

Series
 "Coming Home"(June 2000)
 "After the Storm" (June 2000)
 "Breaking Free" (October 2000)
 "Taking Chances" (February 2001)
 "Come What May" (June 2001)
 "One Day You'll Know" (October 2001)
 "Out of Darkness" (February 2002)
 "Thicker Than Water" (June 2002)
 "Every New Day" (September 2002)
 "Tomorrow's Promise" (December 2002)
 "True Enough" (March 2003)
 "Sooner or Later" (June 2003)
 "Darkest Hour" (September 2003)
 "Everything Changes" (December 2003)
 "Love is a Gift" (March 2004)
 "Holding Fast" (June 2004)
 "A Season of Hope" (September 2004)
 "New Beginnings" (March/April 2005)
 "From This Day On" (July 2005)
 "Always There" (July 2005)

Special Edition Books
 "A Holiday Memory" (November 2004) also published in UK as "Winter Memories" (November 2004)
 "Amy's Journal" (December 2005)
 "Beyond the Horizon" (April 2007)
 "Winter's Gift" (October 2007)
 "A Summer to Remember" (May 2008)

Characters

Amy Fleming - The main character of the series. After the death of her mother and the injuries of Amy in an accident during a storm when Amy and her mother went to rescue an abused horse they had named Spartan, Amy is challenged with both her runaway emotions and managing the equine sanctuary, Heartland, she calls home. With the help of her friends and family, she pulls through and decides to take over her mother's legacy. Her natural talent with horses helped her to cure and save many otherwise neglected animals, and despite the doubts of many, she stays strong to her beliefs. Over the years, her relationship with Ty, the stable hand, develops and they grow closer to each other. Amy faces hard challenges in her life, especially when it comes to deciding her future: college or Heartland. Amy has a brief cameo appearance in the Chestnut Hill series, also by Lauren Brooke.

Jack Bartlett - Amy and Lou's grandfather. He is a kind, yet stubborn, man and often helps the girls with the horses and acts as a counselor to characters in the books. He helps the girls process their grief after their mother's death, and re-introduces Tim Fleming, Amy and Lou's father, into their life. Jack has never forgiven Tim for leaving Marion after his accident.

Samantha Louise "Lou" Fleming-Trewin - Amy's  23-year-old sister. Lou is organized and runs the business side of Heartland after her mother's death. Amy  looks up to Lou; she is practical and brave, like Tim. Lou is very close to her dad and they were inseparable during her childhood, and eventually adulthood. She marries Scott and has a daughter, Holly Marion.

Ty Baldwin - The stable hand at Heartland, Ty dropped out of high school to pursue a permanent position at Heartland. He helps cure the horses. Ty is one of Amy's closest friends throughout the series, and eventually her boyfriend. He helps her through personal and professional challenges, and he often understands her when no one else can. Ty and Amy have a close relationship, and they become boyfriend & girlfriend later in the series. However, they break up when Amy leaves for college, but remain friends as of "A Winter's Gift".

Scott Trewin - The local vet for Heartland. Scott agrees with Heartland's alternative methods of treating horses. He is also Matt's older brother. He marries Lou and thus is Amy's brother-in-law, as well as a half-brother-in-law to Lily, Tim's daughter with Helena. He and Lou have a daughter named Holly Marion.

Soraya Martian - Amy's best friend since the 3rd grade. She helps Amy through hard times and, as a horse lover her herself, occasionally helps at Heartland as well as going on countless trail rides with Amy. During the series, she becomes romantically involved with Matt Trewin, and later, a boy named Anthony .

Ashley Grant - Amy's rival in the series. Ashley's parents own Green Briar Stables, a stable for competition horses. Ashley often competes against Amy in jumping competitions. Perhaps as a result of her parents' constant pressure and high expectations, Ashley is extremely competitive and hostile towards Amy and her peers.

Valerie "Val" Grant - The owner of Green Briar, Heartland's rival, Val is described as overbearing and snobby. Val believes in using very firm discipline- for example, whips and riding crops- on her horses; many of her students agree with her techniques. Val considers it a waste of time to develop a relationship with horses. Val schools her ponies to respond to the commands of any rider and her horses learn to "excel in one area and complete a course to win". Val, Ted and Ashley periodically attempt to shut Heartland down. Val is often an antagonist in the Heartland novels.

Timothy "Tim" Fleming - Lou and Amy's father. Tim and Amy have not seen each other since Amy was 3, but their relationship evolves as the series progresses. He left Amy's mother and her family after he was hurt in a riding accident. Tim was paralysed in his accident; he is now in a wheel chair. After some time, Tim evidently began to regret leaving Marion, Amy and Lou. He found out where they were living and he sent a letter asking forgiveness, which Marion did not respond to. After Marion's death, he comes to visit Lou and Amy ("Thicker Than Water") and Amy finds out she is closer to her father than she thinks. He is now married to Helena and has another daughter, Lily.

Benjamin "Ben" Stillman - Ben's aunt sent him to work at Heartland. However, he realized that he wanted to focus more on his riding skills than his skill with troubled horses. He went to work for Nick Halliwell along with Daniel. They both compete in riding, Ben with his horse, Red, and Daniel with Storm.

Marion Bartlett-Fleming - Jack's daughter, a horse listener. Lou and Amy's mother and Tim's ex-wife. Heartland, and its alternative therapeutic methods, are described in the series as having been Marion's vision; Amy credits her knowledge of herbal remedies and training techniques to her mother.  Marion dies in the beginning of the series from a trailer accident as she and Amy are trying to rescue an abandoned horse.

Use of Alternative and Herbal Treatments

Amy and the staff at Heartland are depicted over the course of the series using several alternative treatment methods for horses. One of the most common of these is the Bach flower essences, used to treat anxiety and induce calm. 
Amy also uses behavioral techniques to help skittish or abused horses; for example, "join-up" or "hooking on", a technique utilized by many natural horsemanship trainers.
She is also periodically seen using massage and acupressure.
One of the types of body work Amy uses is called Tellington TTouch, created by Linda Tellington-Jones. Amy uses other aspects of the Tellington Method to help horses learn to trailer safely, and to learn improved confidence on the ground and under saddle. Amy's references to physical characteristics of horses to analyze equine personality are based on Tellington-Jones' book "Getting in TTouch: Understand and Influence Your Horse's Personality."

References

External links

Heartland at Scholastic Canada

Novel series
Series of children's books
Novels set in Virginia
Pony books